This is a list of international visits undertaken by Antony Blinken (in office since 2021) while currently serving as the United States Secretary of State. The list includes both private travel and official visits. The list includes only foreign travel which the Secretary of State made during his tenure in the position.

Summary 
The number of visits per country or territory where Secretary Blinken traveled are:
 One visit to Afghanistan, Algeria, Australia, Canada, Costa Rica, Chile, the Democratic Republic of the Congo, Denmark, Ecuador, Estonia, Ethiopia, Fiji, Greece, Greenland, Iceland, Ireland, Jordan, Kazakhstan, Kenya, Kuwait, Lithuania, Malaysia, Moldova, Morocco, Niger, Nigeria, Panama, Peru, the Philippines, Romania, Rwanda, Saudi Arabia, Senegal, South Africa, South Korea, Spain, Sweden, Turkey, the United Arab Emirates, and Uzbekistan
Two visits to Cambodia, Colombia, India, Italy, Latvia, Qatar, Switzerland, Thailand, and Vatican City
Three visits to Egypt, Indonesia, Japan, Mexico, and Poland
 Four visits to France, Israel, the Palestinian National Authority, Ukraine, and the United Kingdom
 Seven visits to Belgium
 Eight visits to Germany

Table

See also 
 Foreign policy of the Joe Biden administration
 List of international presidential trips made by Joe Biden

References

2021 beginnings
Trips made by Antony Blinken as United States Secretary of State
2020s politics-related lists
United States Secretary of State
S
United States diplomacy-related lists
|Blinken
2020s timelines